Barnt Green House is a building at Barnt Green, Worcestershire, England. It is a Grade II listed building.

It was once a residence of the local nobles, the Earls of Plymouth. Queen Victoria is reputed to have spent the night there.

The house was bought by Other Windsor, 6th Earl of Plymouth in 1811, from the previous occupants, the Yates family.

Records state that the house was built in 1651, however it appears to have been extensively refurbished in the early 19th century, in a Tudorbethan style.

The building has lost almost all of its grounds and is now a wine bar and gastropub, known as the Barnt Green Inn.

See also
 History of Worcestershire

References

Grade II listed buildings in Worcestershire
Country houses in Worcestershire
1651 establishments in England